Ian David Luder  (born 1951) was the 681st Lord Mayor of London, serving from 2008 to 2009.

Biography
Born into a Jewish family as the son of a mathematics teacher, Luder attended The Haberdashers' Aske's Boys' School, Elstree before reading Economics and Economic History at University College London (BA). He then worked as a tax accountant for Arthur Andersen and later Grant Thornton. He regularly comments on tax matters and helped to found the Worshipful Company of Tax Advisers, and is a liveryman of the Coopers' Company. He entered local government as a Labour councillor on Bedford Borough Council, serving for 23 years. Luder also stood for Parliament as the Labour candidate for Yeovil in 1979.

Luder was Aldermanic Sheriff of London for 2007–08 and was elected Lord Mayor on 29 September 2008, taking office in the "Silent Ceremony" on 7 November. He was appointed Commander of the Order of the British Empire (CBE) in the 2010 New Year Honours.

In 2008, Luder and his wife were involved in a dispute with their neighbours over the neighbours' cat. Apparently the Luders had refused their neighbours' request to stop feeding the animal, who was overweight and had a heart condition, and in fact had shut the cat in their home for 36 hours while they were away.

On 28 March 2012, Luder was announced as the new chairman of Basildon and Thurrock University Hospitals NHS Foundation Trust. He took up the post on 1 July that year. Shortly after his selection in January 2015 as a UKIP candidate for the 2015 general election, Luder stood down as Trust chairman.

Politics
In December 2014, Luder was one of five people on the shortlist to become United Kingdom Independence Party candidate for the constituency of South Basildon and East Thurrock at the 2015 general election. At the initial selection meeting he was not chosen as the candidate. Shortly afterwards, the successful candidate, Kerry Smith, resigned as UKIP's nominee for the seat after he was recorded making offensive remarks about fellow party members in a telephone conversation. A new selection was held in January 2015, which Luder won. Luder contested the general election and came second, polling 12,097 votes (26.5% of the total), 7,692 votes behind the incumbent Conservative candidate, Stephen Metcalfe. Smith polled 401 votes and finished in fifth place.

References

External links
 Debrett's People of Today

1951 births
Living people
British Jews
Jewish British politicians
People educated at Haberdashers' Boys' School
Alumni of University College London
21st-century lord mayors of London
20th-century British politicians
21st-century British politicians
Sheriffs of the City of London
Commanders of the Order of the British Empire
Labour Party (UK) parliamentary candidates
Councillors in Bedfordshire
Labour Party (UK) councillors
UK Independence Party parliamentary candidates